The Kaisers were a Scottish beat band formed in 1992 in Edinburgh, Scotland. The band recorded several albums and singles under a number of record labels, including No-Hit Records, Bedrock Records, Wild Wild Records and Get Hip Records. Their final album, Shake Me! was released under Get Hip Records. Former members have been associated with The Bristols and Janey And The Ravemen since the disbanding of the group.

Imperial Wireless years

Formation and first recordings (1992-1995)
The Kaisers began playing early rock and roll classics and after developing their traditional sound further, they established themselves as a band in Edinburgh, Scotland, in 1992. The band subsequently signed to the London label No Hit and began working with the music producer Liam Watson at Toe Rag Studios in Shoreditch, London, where they quickly released their first album, Squarehead Stomp!, in 1993.

Not long after the promotion of their first record, they made several television appearances—including a spot on the NB Television Show in Scotland.  In 1994, In Step With The Kaisers was released, plus an EP called Alligator Stomp!, which included tracks that were not featured on either of the previous albums. To promote the record they appeared on a BBC Radio Scotland program special reviewing The Beatles Biopic Backbeat film. It was on the radio show the Usual Suspects that Miller stated, "We're not The Beatles; we're not Gerry & The Pacemakers, we're The Kaisers." The Kaisers also recorded two numbers for the program, "Soldier Of Love" and "Money (That's What I Want)", at the BBC Scotland studios.

Cracks emerge
By this point, problems had arisen and bassist John Gibbs had left. The band appointed Matt Curtis as bass player just in time for their appearance on Wire TV for an Edinburgh Festival TV special. A few months later The Kaisers were back in the studio with Watson recording Beat It Up! - arguably their best album and what people would consider to be The Kaisers at their apex. Beat It Up! gathered a storm in the underground market and led to The Kaisers' first US tour, their biggest achievement to date. The tour led to a show at the punk rock club CBGB's.

Following another TV appearance for the Good Morning Breakfast Show in the UK and a few appearances around the country, the Kaisers suffered another departure, when Matt Armstrong left on sabbatical. Keith Warwick took his place before a trip to Alkmaar in 1995. Matt Curtis also left soon after in 1995 before getting replaced by Mark Ferrie.

Get Hip years

Second US tour and demise of the Kaisers (1995-2002)
Following further personnel changes, only two original members remained—George Miller and Johnny Maben. Even though the band's most prolific years had passed, the pair soldiered on with a new album, Wishing Street, and a second US tour. The band's momentum had faltered and the members were involved in side projects. Furthermore, Maben's relocation to London made it inconvenient for the band to record and rehearse. The Kaisers seemed to be recovering when the band was interviewed on The Mark Radcliffe Studio on BBC Radio 2 in 1996. Five tracks were recorded live for the program and the band also appeared on the John Peel show that same year.

During the early stage of the band's career, The Kaisers recorded three albums, two extended players (EPs) and two singles over three years. In the period following 1996 the band's work rate slowed down, and The Kaisers recorded two studio albums and a Christmas single over six years (these were not recorded at Toe Rag Studios or produced by Liam Watson, but were instead recorded at Chamber Studios in Edinburgh). By the time of the release of Shake Me!, the Kaisers final album, in 2002, the band was no longer functional.  At the completion of the album, the members decided to disband. While an official announcement has not been made, the members of the band have not worked together since 2002.

Line-ups 
1992-1994

George Miller-Lead Guitar Matt Armstrong-Guitar John Gibbs-Bass Johnny Maben-Drums

1994-1995

George Miller-Lead Guitar Matt Armstrong-Guitar Matt Curtis-Bass Johnny Maben-Drums

1995

George Miller-Lead Guitar Keith Warwick-Guitar Matt Curtis-Bass Johnny Maben-Drums

1995-1999

George Miller-Lead Guitar Angus McIntyre-Guitar Mark Ferrie-Bass Johnny Maben-Drums

1999

George Miller-Lead Guitar Matt Armstrong-Guitar Mark Ferrie-Bass Johnny Maben-Drums

1999

George Miller-Lead Guitar Dean Micetich-Guitar Mark Ferrie-Bass Johnny Maben-Drums

1999-2002

George Miller-Lead Guitar Matt Armstrong-Guitar Angus McIntyre-Guitar Mark Ferrie-Bass Johnny Maben-Drums

Discography 
Squarehead Stomp! (1993)
In Step with the Kaisers (1994)
Beat It Up! (1995)
Wishing Street (1997)
Twist with the Kaisers (1999)Shake Me! (2002)Ruff'n'Rare'' (2018)

References

Musical groups established in 1992
Musical groups disestablished in 2002
Musical groups from Edinburgh
1992 establishments in Scotland
Beat groups
British rock and roll music groups
Scottish garage rock groups